Ultimate Book of Spells is a 2001–2002 Canadian children's animated television series produced by BKN International. It ran for 26 episodes.

Inspired by the popular Harry Potter book and movie series, the show presents a trio of "wizards-in-training" at an enchanted private school run by Miss Crystalgazer. Cassy is a junior witch, Gus is a half-elf/half-human junior wizard, and Verne is a promising "mortie", i.e. a non-magical human. With the guidance of the talking Ultimate Book of Spells (aka UBOS), the three have to battle the evil wizard Zarlak, who's trying to steal all of the world's spells.

Characters

Main characters
Cassandra "Cassy" (voiced by Janyse Jaud) - the leader of the trio, junior witch and the main protagonist of the series. She wants to become a sorceress, a class considered superior to witches. It is revealed that Cassy is the great-granddaughter of the wizard who defeated and banished Zarlak - a wizard that is now disguised as UBOS. 
Gus - he is half-elf and half-wizard. He is quite confident and sometimes acts childishly. Initially, he looks down on Verne; due to his "mortie" status, but Verne manages to redeem himself by saving Gus's life. 
Verne (voiced by Cathy Weseluck) - he is a mortal wizard who has magical powers and can naturally mend electronic devices. Because of his mortal status, he is called a "mortie". At some points, he is quite cowardly and is surprised by almost anything that involves magic. He is quite skilled in techno magic which is good for putting ordinary electronics or mechanical devices together to make useful gadgets. It is revealed that Verne is a descendent of Merlin and they share same surname Ambrocious.
UBOS (voiced by Ron Halder): An elderly looking book that has the power to teleport the three to the centre of the world where they must stop Zarlak. He tends to be quite grumpy (mostly when Cassy stuffs him in her backpack) and hits the three on the head when he's scolding them. It is revealed throughout the series that he is Cassy's great-grandfather. UBOS is also the title character of the series.
Erbert (voiced by Michael Dobson) - he is a prince who was cursed by Zarlack to look like a toy frog and confined at the magic school the Vonderland. He is the friend of the trio and UBOS. He stays with Gus and Verne in their room. Although he refuses at first he is seen travelling with them to defeat Zarlack in some episodes.
Zarlak - an evil wizard and the main antagonist of the series; who seeks world domination. He desires to get his hands on UBOS; so that he will have enough power to not only escape his prison, but to destroy and rule the world.
Rowce and Snerrot - Zarlack's henchmen whom he often loses patience with. They have the power to combine to become a two-headed dragon, but like most henchmen, are rather dimwitted.

Other characters
Ilsa - a 12-foot-tall (3.7 m) giant girl whose father is a big man (literally) in Vonderland. She was roommates with Cassy for a short while. Due to her size, Ilsa had trouble fitting in.
Lucretia and Borgia - the evil fraternal twins who try to make trouble for Cassy, Gus and Verne. Their father used to serve Zarlak, but defected before Zarlak's defeat, thus; avoiding punishment for his crimes.
Crystalgazer - the headmistress of Vonderland. She can transform into a cat at will.
Saysme - another teacher of Vonderland; he is a young man with a top hat and teaches age regression magic.
Beagleboyce - the librarian of Vonderland.
Mayday - a ghost in charge of scoot-zoomer driving tests.
Scrimpy - an imp who calls out to the trio for help when Zarlack attacks his village.
Flaherty - a leprechaun who was forced into helping Lucretia cheat, by tinkering with Cassie's scoot-zoomer while racing, before he was freed.
Wingo and Jingo - the two mischievous gremlins who were cast into a cuckoo clock for 100 years after losing a battle with Vonderland's builders. They are allowed to come out once a century to play while the whole school is put under a sleeping spell.
Snap the Dragon (voiced by Michael Dobson) - a dragon.

Other voices

Tony Alcanter
Michael Benyaer
Don Brown
Jim Byrnes
Richard Cox
Paul Dobson
Patricia Drake
Brian Drummond
Andrew Francis
McKenzie Gray
Ron Halder
Phil Hayes
Saffron Henderson
Mark Hildreth
Matt Hill
Janyse Jaud
Ellie King
Terry Klassen

Michael Kopsa
Campbell Lane
Blu Mankuma
Kirby Morrow
Colin Murdock
Richard Newman
Pauline Newstone
Nicole Oliver
William Samples
Tabitha St. Germain
Samuel Vincent
Cathy Weseluck
Colleen Wheeler
Alec Willows

Crew
Susan Blu - Voice Director
Sean Catherine Derek - Story Editor

Episodes

In the U.S. DVD release of this series, "Solo Sorceress" is not the final episode and occurs significantly earlier in the play order.

Production
On 19 April 2001, BKN pre-sold the series to CBBC in the United Kingdom.

On 20 June 2002, Toon Disney purchased the North American broadcast rights for the series.

In 2021, the show started airing on London Live in the United Kingdom.

Home Media

United Kingdom
In the United Kingdom, Universal Pictures UK released two VHS volumes. The first - "Three is a Charm", was released in 2002, and the second: "Solo Sorceress" was released on 21 April 2003. A double-pack containing both tapes was also released.

"Three is a Charm" was later released on DVD by Universal on 10 May 2004.

United States
A VHS tape containing two episodes titled "The Mystic Gem" was released at an unknown date.

Budget distributor Digiview Entertainment released three DVDs each containing four episodes in 2007, titled  "Three's a Charm", "Fire with Fire" and "Out of Shape".

Mill Creek Entertainment released a two-disc boxset containing all 26 episodes on 5 January 2010.

Cancelled Video Game
On 7 October 2001, TDK Mediactive announced they would produce a video game based on the series in 2002, although nothing was confirmed afterwards.

References

External links

UBOS Theme tune on YouTube

Canadian children's animated fantasy television series
2001 Canadian television series debuts
2002 Canadian television series endings
2000s Canadian animated television series
German children's animated fantasy television series
2001 German television series debuts
2002 German television series endings
Television series by Corus Entertainment
YTV (Canadian TV channel) original programming
Animated television series about children
English-language television shows